Clark Range can refer to one of the following mountain ranges:
 Clark Range (California) in Yosemite National Park, California
 Clark Mountain Range in the Mojave Desert, California
 Clark Range (Canada) in the Canadian Rockies
 Clark Mountains in Antarctica

See also:
 Clarke Range in Australia